The 2020 Mikhail Voronin Cup took place on December 17–21 in Penza, Russia.

Medal winners

Senior

Junior

References

Voronin Cup
2020 in gymnastics
2020 in Russian sport
Sport in Penza
December 2020 sports events in Russia